The 3 arrondissements of the Cher department are:
 Arrondissement of Bourges, (prefecture of the Cher department: Bourges) with 128 communes. The population of the arrondissement was 173,054 in 2016.  
 Arrondissement of Saint-Amand-Montrond, (subprefecture: Saint-Amand-Montrond) with 116 communes.  The population of the arrondissement was 63,921 in 2016.  
 Arrondissement of Vierzon, (subprefecture: Vierzon) with 43 communes.  The population of the arrondissement was 70,135 in 2016.

History

In 1800 the arrondissements of Bourges, Saint-Amand-Montrond and Sancerre were established. The arrondissement of Sancerre was disbanded in 1926. The arrondissement of Vierzon was created in 1984.

References

Cher